

Current programming

Former programming

References

 Animal Planet original programming
 American television-related lists